Marc Diraison  is an American voice actor, ADR director, and script writer who has worked for Bang Zoom! Entertainment, NYAV Post, 4Kids Entertainment and DuArt Film and Video. He is best known as the English voice of Guts in Berserk animated adaptations, specifically the 1997 anime adaptation and the 2011 movie trilogy;, Akihiko Kayaba in Sword Art Online and Tokiomi Tohsaka in Fate/Zero.

Filmography

Anime

Animation

Films

Video games

References

External links
 
 
 

Living people
American male voice actors
American voice directors
American male video game actors
20th-century American male actors
21st-century American male actors
Year of birth missing (living people)
Place of birth missing (living people)